Cyperus compactus is a sedge of the family Cyperaceae that is native to the South East Asia, Madagascar and  northern Australia.

In Australia it is found in the Kimberley region of Western Australia as well as parts of the Northern Territory and Queensland.

See also
List of Cyperus species

References

Plants described in 1788
compactus
Taxa named by Anders Jahan Retzius
Flora of Western Australia
Flora of the Northern Territory
Flora of Queensland
Flora of Assam (region)
Flora of Bangladesh
Flora of Borneo
Flora of Cambodia
Flora of China
Flora of India
Flora of Indonesia
Flora of Laos
Flora of Madagascar
Flora of Malaysia
Flora of Myanmar
Flora of Nepal
Flora of New Guinea
Flora of Pakistan
Flora of the Philippines
Flora of Sri Lanka
Flora of Taiwan
Flora of Thailand
Flora of Tibet
Flora of Vietnam